Peter Herbert (born 8 January 1947) is an Australian cricketer. He played in four first-class matches for South Australia in 1971/72.

See also
 List of South Australian representative cricketers

References

External links
 

1947 births
Living people
Australian cricketers
South Australia cricketers
Cricketers from Adelaide